A set dance is set of dance moves and steps. It may refers to :
 A kind of solo dance in irish stepdance 
 Irish set dancing, an irish Country dance in groups of eight or four dancers, derived from the French quadrille
 A kind of contra dance